Forest View is a village in Cook County, Illinois, United States. Per the 2020 census, the population was 792. It is primarily an industrial corridor adjacent to the Chicago neighborhood of Garfield Ridge, which is on the village's southern border.

Geography
Forest View is located at  (41.807379, -87.786065).

Demographics
As of the 2020 census there were 792 people, 361 households, and 301 families residing in the village. The racial makeup of the village was 54.17% White, 2.02% African American, 4.42% Native American, 1.52% Asian, 0.00% Pacific Islander, 20.33% from other races, and 17.55% from two or more races. Hispanic or Latino of any race were 48.86% of the population.

There were 361 households, out of which 107.48% had children under the age of 18 living with them, 66.20% were married couples living together, 9.42% had a female householder with no husband present, and 16.62% were non-families. 14.40% of all households were made up of individuals, and 6.65% had someone living alone who was 65 years of age or older. The average household size was 4.07 and the average family size was 3.63.

The village's age distribution consisted of 31.8% under the age of 18, 4.7% from 18 to 24, 23.8% from 25 to 44, 24.7% from 45 to 64, and 15.0% who were 65 years of age or older. The median age was 37.1 years. For every 100 females, there were 105.3 males. For every 100 females age 18 and over, there were 96.7 males.

The median income for a household in the village was $97,321, and the median income for a family was $110,347. Males had a median income of $50,379 versus $46,000 for females. The per capita income for the village was $33,010. About 1.3% of families and 1.8% of the population were below the poverty line, including 0.0% of those under age 18 and 1.5% of those age 65 or over.

Note: the US Census treats Hispanic/Latino as an ethnic category. This table excludes Latinos from the racial categories and assigns them to a separate category. Hispanics/Latinos can be of any race.

Government
Forest View is in Illinois' 3rd congressional district.

Education
Forest View is served by Lyons School District 103. Grade school students attend Home Elementary School in neighboring Stickney, and George Washington Middle School in Lyons.

It is served by J. Sterling Morton High School District 201's Morton West located in Berwyn as its residential areas are west of Ridgeland Avenue.

References

External links
Village of Forest View
Stickney-Forest View Public Library District

Villages in Illinois
Villages in Cook County, Illinois
Chicago metropolitan area
Populated places established in 1924
1924 establishments in Illinois
Majority-minority cities and towns in Cook County, Illinois